Ian Porter may refer to:

 Ian Porter (actor) (born 1965), American actor now living in the UK
 Ian Porter (politician) (1950–1999), Australian local politician
 Ian Porter (rugby union) (born 1988), rugby union player from Ireland
 Ian Porter (rower), Australian rower